USS Hupa (SP-650) was a United States Navy patrol vessel in commission from 1917 to 1919.

Hupa was built as a private motorboat of the same name by George Lawley & Son at Neponset, Massachusetts, in 1905. In June 1917, the U.S. Navy acquired her from her owner, L. T. Carey of Boston, Massachusetts, for use as a section patrol boat during World War I. She was commissioned as USS Hupa (SP-650) at Boston on 10 July 1917.

Assigned to the 1st Naval District in northern New England, and based at Provincetown, Massachusetts, Hupa served on patrol duties in Cape Cod Bay and on the Cape Cod Canal.

Hupa was stricken from the Navy List on 25 October 1919 and offered for sale. She finally was sold to the Hyde Engineering Works of Montreal, Quebec, Canada, on 12 March 1920.

References

SP-650 Hupa at Department of the Navy Naval History and Heritage Command Online Library of Selected Images: U.S. Navy Ships -- Listed by Hull Number "SP" #s and "ID" #s -- World War I Era Patrol Vessels and other Acquired Ships and Craft numbered from SP-600 through SP-699
NavSource Online: Section Patrol Craft Photo Archive Hupa (SP 650)

Patrol vessels of the United States Navy
World War I patrol vessels of the United States
Ships built in Boston
1905 ships